Marc "Babaloo" Mandel (born October 13, 1949) is an American screenwriter. He first wrote episodic television comedy, then later began writing feature films. He and long-time writing partner Lowell Ganz penned numerous high-profile films including Splash (1984), Parenthood (1989), City Slickers (1991) and A League of Their Own (1992).

Biography
Mandel was born in New York City, the son of a taxi driver. He attended Queens College, City University of New York, before leaving for Hollywood in 1972.

There he met Ganz. It was Ganz who gave him the nickname "Babaloo", after the character Babaloo Mandel in Philip Roth's novel Portnoy's Complaint. Mandel and Ganz were featured in The Dialogue interview series. In the 90-minute interview with producer Mike DeLuca, they discussed their 40-year partnership as it evolved from television to feature films.

Both men worked on the television series Happy Days, Mandel as a creative consultant, Ganz as supervising producer. As a result of that connection, they were offered their first big break, the movie Night Shift, by series star Ron Howard and his friend, producer Brian Grazer. Howard directed Night Shift, and it was Grazer's first feature film as producer. The writing duo later reteamed with Howard on Splash, for which Mandel, Ganz and Bruce Jay Friedman won the National Society of Film Critics Award for Best Screenplay. Mandel, Ganz, Friedman and Grazer were also nominated for the Academy Award for Best Writing, Screenplay Written Directly for the Screen.

The pair also wrote for the television series Laverne & Shirley. They were the screenwriters for the 1992 sports movie A League of Their Own, directed by Penny Marshall (who played Laverne in the sitcom).

He married Denise Madelyn (nee Horn) in 1974. They have six children, including a set of triplets.

The Online Archive of California has the Lowell Ganz & Babaloo Mandel Collection of material related to their writing careers.

Partial filmography

Night Shift (1982)
Splash (1984)
Spies Like Us (1985)
Gung Ho (1986)
Vibes (1988)
Parenthood (1989)
City Slickers (1991)
A League of Their Own (1992)
Mr. Saturday Night (1992)
Greedy (1994)
City Slickers II: The Legend of Curly's Gold (1994)
Forget Paris (1995)
Multiplicity (1996)
Fathers' Day (1997)
EDtv (1999)
Where the Heart Is (2000)
Robots (2005)
Fever Pitch (2005)
Tooth Fairy (2010)

Partial television credits
Busting Loose (1977)
Laverne & Shirley (1977–78)
Happy Days (1981)

References

External links

1949 births
Screenwriters from New York (state)
Living people
20th-century American screenwriters
20th-century American male writers
21st-century American screenwriters
21st-century American male writers
Writers from Queens, New York
American male television writers
American television writers